Cardinal Cushing Memorial Park (or Cardinal Cushing Park) is a park located at 5 New Chardon Street in Boston, Massachusetts, United States. The park features a bust of Richard Cushing.

References

External links
 

Monuments and memorials in Boston
Parks in Boston